Christian Lapointe (born 1978) is a Canadian theatre director from Quebec.

Biography

clear

Born in the region of Quebec, Christian Lapointe was admitted as a student in interpretation at the Conservatoire d'art dramatique de Québec and then trained in directing at the National Theater School of Canada, from where he graduated in 2005. In the fall of 2001, he directed a first triptych of short plays by William Butler Yeats. Following a co-production with a theatrical institution in Hanoi and the staging of a second play by the Irish poet Yeats, he entered, in 2003, the further education in directing at the National Theater School of Canada. .

He is the founder of the Péril theater and artistic director of Carte Blanche. At the Festival TransAmériques 2015, he gave a performance lasting almost three days and two nights around the work of Antonin Artaud.

He performed in the play Le 20 Novembre, conducted by Brigitte Haentjens. His performance earned him a nomination for the prize of the Association québécoise des critiques de théâtre. He also worked alongside Larry Tremblay for the play L'Enfant material for the staging.

Over time, he established himself as a moving figure in Quebec theater thanks to the consistency and rigor of his approach, which is particularly atypical in the context of this theatrical landscape. In Sepsis, the last opus of the Cycle de la Disparition, six actors philosophize about their existence from a morgue. Moreover, death is a recurring theme in Lapointe's works, because the fact of being in a body that has a limited lifespan is an idea that obsesses him. When he was 19, he suffered an accident that required several skin grafts on his neck and torso; this event put his relationship to death in perspective.

Heir to the symbolist movement, the writing of his shows borrows from performance art, is conceived from and around scenic devices and flirts with video installation. A pedagogue with an approach based around observable notions of the art of acting in the theatre, he is the creator of a pedagogical methodology centered on the thickening of the presence on stage by the modulation of scenic positioning within the framework of a actoral theatrical practice. Thus, text and gestures are intrinsically linked during its representations and can vary according to the energy and the attention of the public. Particular attention is paid to the relationship between stage and hall and reality and fiction. His Petit guide de l’apparition à l’usage de those qu’on se pas et Les Jours gris testify to this approach.

His works have been presented, among others, at the National Arts Center in Ottawa, at the Carrefour international de théâtre du Québec and at the Festival TransAmériques.

After having taught there for nearly eight years, on January 25, 2016, he began an artistic residency as an artist and teacher at the National Theater School. Then, he will be professor of interpretation at the École Supérieure de Théâtre until 2021.

In 2019, he launched Constituons!, in partnership with the Institut du Nouveau Monde, a process that proposes to provide Quebec with a constitution entirely written by citizens selected by lot and representative of the demographics of Quebec society and this, within the framework of a testing of the theater as a popular agora. It is supported in this process by more than a dozen theatrical institutions throughout Quebec in addition to having significant support from the Quebec academic world. The Citizens’ Constitution of Quebec that emerged from this process was officially tabled in the National Assembly of Quebec on May 29, 2019 by independent MNA Catherine Fournier.

In June 2022, he staged, as an interpreter of his play Not One Of These People, the British author Martin Crimp who thus treads the boards for the first time in his career. For this performance, Lapointe imagines and designs a live deepfake device that animates, through facial recognition, avatars generated by GAN - Generative adversarial network.

Productions
 2001 : Le chien de Culann (d'après - Au puits de l'épervier / L'unique rivale d'Emer / La mort de Cuchulainn) - by William Butler Yeats
 2002 : Hoi Sinh / Dichotomie – création
 2003 : Le seuil du palais du roi – by William Butler Yeats
 2004 : Faisceau d'épingle de verre  - by Claude Gauvreau
 2006 : Axël – de Auguste de Villiers de L'Isle-Adam
 2006 : Shopping and F***ing – by Mark Ravenhill
 2007 : C.H.S. – by Christian Lapointe
 2007 : Le vol des anges – according to the text by Luis Thénon
 2008 : Anky ou la fuite / Opéra du désordre – by Christian Lapointe
 2008 : Vu d'ici - by Mathieu Arsenault
 2009 : Nature morte dans un fossé - by Fausto Paravidino
 2009 : Limbes (d'après - Calvaire / Résurrection / Purgatoire) - by William Butler Yeats
 2010 : Trans(e) – by Christian Lapointe
 2012 : Sepsis – by Christian Lapointe
 2012 : L'Enfant matière – by Larry Tremblay
 2013 : Outrage au public – by Peter Handke
 2015 : Dans la République du bonheur - by Martin Crimp
 2016 : Pelléas et Mélisande - by Maurice Maeterlinck
 2017 : La vie littéraire – de Mathieu Arsenault
 2018 : Portrait Of Restless Narcissism (PORN) – de Nadia Ross et Christian Lapointe
 2018 : Les beaux dimanches – de Marcel Dubé
 2018 : Le reste vous le connaissez par le cinéma – de Martin Crimp
 2019 : Constituons!'' – de Christian Lapointe
 2022 : Quand nous nous serons suffisamment torturés de Martin Crimp
 2022 : Titre(s) de travail de Natalie Fontalvo, Lauren Hartley, Odile Gagné-Roy, Christian Lapointe et Marie-Ève Lussier
 2022 : Not one of these people de Martin Crimp
 2022 : We are shining forever à la recherche de l’entrée du royaume des morts d’après La morte de Mathieu Arsenault

References

http://www.cyberpresse.ca/le-soleil/arts-et-spectacles/theatre/200904/02/01-842998-christian-lapointe-donnera-chs-au-festival-davignon.php

External links
Christian Lapointe - À voix haute 
Christian Lapointe's page at CEAD 

1978 births
Canadian theatre directors
Living people